The Gambia Independence Act 1964 (1964 c. 93) was an Act of the Parliament of the United Kingdom that gave independence to The Gambia with effect from 18 February 1965.  The Act also provided for the continued right of appeal from the Gambian courts to the Judicial Committee of the Privy Council, which was abolished in 1998 when Yahya Jammeh decided to reorganise the Gambian judiciary under the 1997 Constitution of The Gambia, which replaced the 1970 Constitution of The Gambia that had been suspended after the 1994 Gambian coup d'état on 22 July 1994.

Marlborough House conference 
On 23 July 1964, a conference was held at Marlborough House to make plans for Gambian independence. A high level delegation from The Gambia, led by Prime Minister Dawda Jawara, met with a British delegation led by Duncan Sandys, the Secretary of State for the Colonies. Sandys discussed an independent Gambia's need for financial assistance, a part he envisaged would be played by the British. However, Sandys also noted that independence 'was not all about money'.

Gambian attendees 

 Dawda Jawara, Prime Minister of The Gambia
 Sheriff Sekouba Sisay, Minister of Finance
 Sheriff Mustapha Dibba
 Alieu Badara Njie, Minister of Works and Communication
 Amang Kanyi, Minister of Agriculture
 Seyfo Omar Mbakeh
 Kalilu Singhateh
 Famara Wassa Touray
 Paul L. Baldeh
 Pierre Sarr N'Jie
 I. A. S. Burang John
 Kebba W. Foon
 I. M. Garba Jahumpa
 Philip Bridges, Attorney General of The Gambia
 F. D. C. Williams
 K. J. W. Lane
 Rev. J. C. Faye
 Sir John Paul, Governor of The Gambia

British attendees 

 Marquess of Lansdowne
 Sir John Martin
 J. M. Kirsch
 H. Steel
 R. G. Pettitt

References

Whitaker's Almanack: for the year 1966, complete edition, p. 321. J. Whitaker & Sons, London, 1965
Chronological table of the statutes; HMSO, London. 1993. 

1964 in the Gambia
History of the Gambia
Independence acts in the Parliament of the United Kingdom
The Gambia and the Commonwealth of Nations
United Kingdom Acts of Parliament 1964
The Gambia–United Kingdom relations